A liquid rocket engine powerhead (or powerpack) is the turbopumps, preburners, and all the requisite equipment for a non-pressure-fed rocket engine cycle rocket engine, minus the combustion chamber and the expansion nozzle.

See also 
 Integrated Powerhead Demonstrator

References 

Rocket engines